Martin Candinas (born 20 August 1980) is a politician of The Center (DM) a member of the National Council of Switzerland and since December 2022, its president. He speaks Romansh which he supports as Switzerland's fourth official language.

Early life 
Candidas was born in Ilanz/Sumvitg and graduated with a Matura from high school in Chur.

Career 
He worked for health insurance Helsana. In 2006 he was promoted to branch director in Chur. After he was elected to the National Council in 2011, he decreased his pensum to 50%. Until 2017 he was in charge of the sales department at the Helsana branches in Samedan, Chur and Glarus. In 2017 he becae a specialist in Partner- and Key account management. In 2016 he assumed the presidencies of the Swiss Helicopter Association and Litra, which provides information on public transport.

Politics 
At age 26, the youngest at the time, Candinas entered the Grand Council of Grisons in 2006. In the Federal Elections of 2011, he was elected to the National Council. He was subsequently re-elected in 2015 and 2019. He was considered as an Executive Councilor in Grisons for the elections in 2018, but he declined.  In 2021, he assumed the Vice-Presidency of the National Council and elected  to the rotating Presidency in November 2022. The Canton of Grisons had not had a President of the National Council for thirty-seven years and his election was celebrated in attendance of the Federal Councilor Viola Amherd in the Disentis Abbey and later Chur.

Political views 
Candinas defended the interests of the mountainous cantons. He supported the farmers in their aim to be allowed to hunt wolves and suggested that municipalities with over 20% of vacation homes should be allowed to provide inhabitants with options to enlarge their homes. He opposed gay marriage. He is one of only three members in the National Council who speak Romansh and as the National Council's Vice-President he used to begin sessions with a phrase in his native language, which he has stated, he will do as its president.

Personal life 
Candinas is married, the father of three children

References 

1980 births
Living people
Swiss politicians
Presidents of the National Council (Switzerland)